Bettina Schieferdecker (born 30 April 1968 in Markranstädt) is a German former gymnast who competed in the 1988 Summer Olympics.

References

1968 births
Living people
People from Markranstädt
People from Bezirk Leipzig
German female artistic gymnasts
Sportspeople from Saxony
Olympic gymnasts of East Germany
Gymnasts at the 1988 Summer Olympics
Olympic bronze medalists for East Germany
Olympic medalists in gymnastics
Medalists at the 1988 Summer Olympics
Recipients of the Patriotic Order of Merit in bronze
20th-century German women